Harvey Neil Reti (1 September 1937 – 3 January 2020) was a Canadian boxer. He won a bronze medal at the 1962 Commonwealth Games in Perth, Australia, and competed in the men's light welterweight event at the 1964 Summer Olympics. At the 1964 Summer Olympics, he lost to István Tóth of Hungary.

References

External links
 

1937 births
2020 deaths
Canadian male boxers
Olympic boxers of Canada
Boxers at the 1964 Summer Olympics
Sportspeople from Saskatchewan
Commonwealth Games medallists in boxing
Commonwealth Games bronze medallists for Canada
Boxers at the 1962 British Empire and Commonwealth Games
Light-welterweight boxers
Medallists at the 1962 British Empire and Commonwealth Games